WGR (550 AM) is a commercial radio station licensed to serve Buffalo, New York. Owned by Audacy, Inc., its studios and offices are located on Corporate Parkway in Amherst, and the transmitter site—utilized by WGR and co-owned WWKB—is in Hamburg.

In addition to a standard analog transmission, WGR is relayed by WKSE's second HD subchannel, and is available online via Audacy.

Programming

WGR has a sports format. The station targets a key demographic of men 25 to 54 years old. It had the highest Nielsen Ratings of any station in the Buffalo market among that demographic as of autumn 2018.   Jeremy White hosts the morning-drive show, followed by The Extra Point Show with Sal Capaccio and Joe DiBiase while middays are split between two daily talk shows produced by Pegula Sports and Entertainment: Sabres Live with Brian Duff and Martin Biron, and One Bills Live with Chris Brown and Steve Tasker. Afternoons are hosted by Mike Schopp and Chris "Bulldog" Parker, while Zach Jones hosts The Nightcap in early evenings.CBS Sports Radio programming airs in late-night, overnights and on weekends. Both Sabres Live and One Bills Live are also carried on television through MSG Western New York.

WGR serves as the flagship outlet for: the professional football Buffalo Bills Radio Network, with John Murphy and Steve Tasker calling all games on-site; the professional Sabres Hockey Network, with Rick Jeanneret, Dan Dunleavy and Rob Ray calling games on-site; and the professional box lacrosse Buffalo Bandits, with John Gurtler and Randy Mearns calling games on-site. The MSG Network also uses this feed as the announcers for the game.

History

Early years

In early 1922, the Federal Telephone & Telegraph Company, headquartered in North Buffalo, began producing radio receivers. As part of its marketing efforts, the company decided to establish a local broadcasting station.

Effective December 1, 1921, the Department of Commerce, which regulated U.S. radio at this time, had adopted regulations formally defining "broadcasting stations". The wavelength of 360 meters (833 kHz) was designated for entertainment broadcasts, while 485 meters (619 kHz) was reserved for broadcasting official weather and other government reports. On March 14 Federal Telephone & Telegraph was issued a license for Buffalo's first radio broadcasting station, with the randomly assigned call letters WGR, transmitting on both 360 and 485 meters. The March 28 issue of the Buffalo Evening News reported hearing test transmissions made by WGR the previous night. On April 1 it was announced that, starting that day, WGR would broadcast weather reports provided by the Department of Navigation on 485 meters each weekday at 12:30 and 6:00 p.m. In mid-April, WGR's regular broadcast schedule was reported to be musical programs sent on 360 meters on Tuesday and Thursday evenings and Sunday afternoons, plus daily weather and market reports on 485 meters.

WGR suspended regular operations while company employees worked on constructing a more powerful transmitter that could be easily heard by the crystal radios the company was selling. In May they were reported to be conducting test transmissions, initially as experimental station 8XAD. The debut for WGR's use of the upgraded transmitter was scheduled for May 21, an event that was described as the "formal opening of one of the largest and most powerful broadcasting stations in the east which may make Buffalo the ethereal center of this part of the country", because "The arrangements and furnishing of the station will be equal to that of any of the present stations of national fame."  The starting date coincided with the first day of "Radio Week" in Buffalo. The May 21 broadcast opened with prayer by Rev. Michael J. Ahren, president of Canisius College, followed by a talk by the dean of the University of Buffalo's college of arts and sciences, Julian Park, on the possibilities of education, Rev. F. Hyatt Smith, Kenmore Presbyterian Church speaking about the nature of "success", and Albert Kinsey, Chamber of Commerce president, reviewing the financial future of Buffalo. This was followed by entertainment by local artists. 

In early 1923 WGR ended the government reports on 485 meters, although it continued making entertainment broadcasts on 360 meters. In September 1922 the Department of Commerce set aside a second entertainment wavelength, 400 meters (750 kHz) for "Class B" stations that had quality equipment and programming. In May 1923 additional "Class B" frequencies were made available, with 940 kHz reserved for "Zone 1", which was assigned to WGR later that year. Effective November 11, 1928, the recently formed Federal Radio Commission implemented its General Order 40, which divided transmitting frequencies into three categories: Clear Channel, Regional and Local. Most former Class B stations became clear channel stations, however WGR was moved to a regional frequency, 550 kHz, while the station previously at that frequency, WMAK, was reassigned to 900 kHz.

In the late 1940s, the station was bought by a consortium of Western New York families known as the WGR Corporation.  The company signed on WGR-TV (channel 2) in 1953 and WGR-FM (now WGRF) in 1959.  WGR Corporation bought several other television and radio stations in the 1950s, and eventually became known as Transcontinent Broadcasting.  Transcontinent merged with Taft Broadcasting in 1964. Taft sold off WGR-TV in 1983.  Due to a current FCC rule that prohibited TV and radio stations in the same market, but with different owners, from sharing the same call letters, the TV station amended its call letters to WGRZ after it was sold. Taft retained both WGR and WGRQ (the former WGR-FM).

During its days as a full service radio station, WGR's roster of personalities included "Buffalo Bob" Smith, later famous for TV's Howdy Doody children's show, and popular national TV and nightclub comedian Foster Brooks. The station's longtime music format combined adult top 40 hits and rock oldies and featured some of Buffalo's top radio personalities, talk hosts and news reporters including Stan Roberts, Frank Benny, Tom Donahue, Randy Michaels, Jim Scott, Jerry Reo, Shane, Joe Galuski, Tom Langmyer, George Hamberger, Tom Shannon, John Otto, Chuck Lakefield, Don Dussias, Lauri Githens, Wayne Smith, Sandy Kozel, Jane Tomczak, Tom Bauerle (as well as his brother, Dick Bauerle), Craig Matthews. WGR gradually evolved to talk radio during the late 1980s.

In 1987, Taft sold WGR and WRLT (the former WGRQ) to Rich Communications, which was part of the Robert Rich family's business holdings, which also included a major processed-food company (and with it, naming rights for the Buffalo Bills stadium then (now called Highmark Stadium) and a venture applying for a National League expansion baseball franchise (for which WGR was projected to be flagship station of the team's projected network). Although the Rich interests were the National League's choice for the new franchise they dropped out of the competition for an expansion team set to begin play in 1993 (which ultimately went to Denver, Colorado, as the Colorado Rockies) for cost reasons. Soon after, WGR was eventually spun off to new owners.

The 1990s: News Radio 55
For much of the 1990s, WGR was a successful news/talk station, competing with WBEN AM 930. From 1990 to 1994, WGR owned the radio broadcast rights to Buffalo Bills football, Buffalo Sabres hockey and the Buffalo Bisons baseball. The Bills' four consecutive Super Bowl seasons were broadcast by WGR, whose Program Directors included Chuck Finney (1991–1993), Daryl Parks (1993–1995) and Jim Pastrick (1995–2000).

Through its news-talk era the WGR line-up featured a variety of programs such as Breakfast with Bauerle (Tom Bauerle), The Fabulous Sports Babe, Chuck Dickerson, Art Wander, Extension 55 with John Otto, Ron Dobson, John and Ken, Rick Emerson, Joey Reynolds, and several other local and national hosts. Syndicated talk radio host Leslie Marshall, controversial talk radio host J. R. Gach and future WFAN New York morning drive fixture Craig Carton also worked at the station. Jesse Ventura was at one time a candidate to host a show on the station, but lost out to Dobson. The station was, from the network's inception, an affiliate of ESPN Radio, which it carried on the weekends from 1992 to 2013.

In 1995, Rich Communications which owned both WGR and its FM counterpart WGRF, sold WGRF to Mercury Radio headed by Charles W. Banta. Simultaneously, Rich Communications entered into a local marketing agreement (LMA) with Keymarket Communications. The Federal Communications Commission approved the sale of WGR to Keymarket within twelve months of the LMA. Keymarket also owned WBEN, WMJQ, WWKB and WKSE. Keymarket merged with River City Broadcasting which was purchased by Sinclair Broadcast Group in 1997. Sinclair Broadcast Group sold its entire radio division to Entercom Communications in 1999. In February 2000, WGR changed formats from News-Talk to Sports-Talk.

Adoption of all sports format
In February 2000, WGR became an all-sports talk radio station. Bauerle, for a short time, was retained and paired with Chris "Bulldog" Parker, who joined from WBEN for the morning show. Chuck Dickerson maintained his afternoon drive show. Jim Rome, who was added to the WGR line-up in late summer 1998, was retained when WGR switched to all sports. Anne Burke, a frequent caller to the station's talk shows, joined Bob Gaughan to co-host middays. Mike Maniscalco and later Brad Riter hosted the evening shift.

From October 2000 to 2004, WGR competed with WNSA-FM, an FM station licensed to Wethersfield, New York, in rural Wyoming county (with a 107.3 translator in Buffalo). The two stations battled for listeners and the rights to broadcast sporting events. Several teams' broadcasts bounced between the two stations, such as the Bandits, New York Yankees, and Buffalo Destroyers.

WGR landed a coup when it signed WNSA's top afternoon host, Mike Schopp, from WNSA-FM in 2002; the event came at about the same time as when John Rigas and Adelphia Communications were beginning to collapse under massive financial scandal. WNSA never recovered and eventually WGR took the upper hand in the local sports radio battle. Schopp was at first teamed with Chuck Dickerson in afternoon drive. When Dickerson departed WGR, Schopp was teamed with Chris "Bulldog" Parker. Bauerle moved from WGR to sister station WBEN, Gaughan joined Kevin Sylvester in morning drive (Burke had been released long before this). Riter was paired with sidekick Jeremy White in the evening and lastly The Tony Kornheiser Show (from ESPN) was added in Gaughan and Burke's old time slot. (Kornheiser would later be replaced by Colin Cowherd by ESPN.)

With the purchase of WNSA, WGR re-joined the New York Yankees radio network and for the first time since 1996, regained the radio rights to the Buffalo Sabres. Howard Simon, also from WNSA, joined in November 2004, with White moving from evenings to mornings to be Simon's sidekick.

In 2006, the Sabres and WGR renewed their broadcast agreement through 2012, and Yankees rights were dropped by 2007. In 2007, host Brad Riter was fired after failing to report for work, and he joined rival WECK in March 2008.  A series of WGR staffers, as well as past and present Buffalo media personalities such as former WNSA and Empire host (and former KOHD-DT morning anchor) Jim Brinson and WIVB-TV sports director Dennis Williams, hosted the vacated slot. (WGR also tried to lure John Murphy, but because he was also at the time the radio host of the Bills, his contract prevented him from hosting the slot.) In January 2008, Williams was hired as the new evening host at WGR; WIVB declined to his contract shortly thereafter, and replaced him with Murphy.  Williams left the station in early 2009 to enter the sales industry. On January 4, 2012, it was announced that WGR would become the Buffalo Bills Radio Network flagship station. With the addition of Buffalo Bills broadcast rights going to WGR, the evening time slot was held by Bills announcer John Murphy.

WGR began a partial simulcast on Rochester sister station WROC in September 2008. Sabres games, Schopp and the Bulldog, and ESPN Radio were carried on WROC; Schopp and the Bulldog was dropped in 2011.

In 2012, WGR secured the rights to the Buffalo Bills Radio Network after previous owner WGRF decided against renewing their contract. As part of the deal, John Murphy began hosting a nightly talk show dedicated to the Bills on nights when the Sabres did not play. At the same time, Kevin Sylvester also returned to the station as the host of a daily Sabres-oriented talk show, Hockey Hotline, which last aired in 2004. WGR parent company Entercom moved the ESPN Radio affiliation to its own full-time affiliate, WWKB, in September 2013. CBS Sports Radio eventually filled the overnight time slots ESPN Radio had previously filled on WGR.

In 2016, the formation of MSG Western New York was announced. A regional sports channel for Western New York, the channel includes both Sabres and Bills programming. Two main WGR shows Sabres Hockey Hotline and The John Murphy Show began simulcasting on the channel on October 3, 2016. WGR and Pegula Sports and Entertainment reached a five-year contract extension for radio broadcasts not long afterward, keeping the Bills and Sabres broadcasts on WGR through 2021.

References

External links

 
 
FCC History Cards for WGR (covering 1927-1981) 
WGR Jock History (billdulmage.com)
Rock Radio Scrapbook page including recordings of Frank Benny and Shane on WGR, April 28, 1980

GR
Radio stations established in 1922
CBS Sports Radio stations
Taft Broadcasting
Audacy, Inc. radio stations
1922 establishments in New York (state)
Radio stations licensed before 1923 and still broadcasting